Maxwell Bidstrup (born June 29, 1990), known professionally as MXXWLL, is a hiphop/funk music composer, producer and performer from Sydney, Australia. He rose to prominence following an online music video of his music production which garnered the attention of Snoop Dogg and DJ Jazzy Jeff. As a solo artist, MXXWLL has released one beat tape album along with several singles and remixes.
MXXWLL released his debut beat tape "Beats Vol 1", in 2017. Prior to the release of the beat tape, he released his 2016 remix of Snakehips single "CRUEL" featuring One Direction's Zayn Malik followed by a remix for ZEDD and Elle Duhe's track "Happy Now" in 2018.

In 2019, MXXWLL produced the highly anticipated single "Purple Emoji" for Ty Dolla Sign featuring J Cole, which premiered as Zane Lowe's world record at Beats 1 on May 20 and was later performed live on The Tonight Show Starring Jimmy Fallon on July 29. Purple Emoji reached number 25 on the Billboard Charts for June 8, 2019.

On May 22, 2020 MXXWLL released his second studio album "SHEEESH" featuring Aloe Blacc, SiR and Guapdad 4000.

References 

1990 births
Living people
Australian hip hop singers